Yubileyny (masculine), Yubileynaya (feminine), or Yubileynoye (neuter) is the name of several rural localities in Russia.

Modern localities

Amur Oblast
As of 2012, two rural localities in Amur Oblast bear this name:
Yubileyny, Amur Oblast, a settlement in Yubileynensky Rural Settlement of Zeysky District
Yubileynoye, Amur Oblast, a selo in Beloyarovsky Rural Settlement of Mazanovsky District

Republic of Buryatia
As of 2012, one rural locality in the Republic of Buryatia bears this name:
Yubileyny, Republic of Buryatia, a settlement in Yubileyny Selsoviet of Barguzinsky District

Chechen Republic
As of 2012, one rural locality in the Chechen Republic bears this name:
Yubileynoye, Chechen Republic, a selo in Levoberezhnenskaya Rural Administration of Naursky District

Republic of Dagestan
As of 2012, one rural locality in the Republic of Dagestan bears this name:
Yubileynoye, Republic of Dagestan (or Yubileyny), a selo in Kizlyarsky Selsoviet of Kizlyarsky District;

Irkutsk Oblast
As of 2012, one rural locality in Irkutsk Oblast bears this name:
Yubileyny, Irkutsk Oblast, a settlement in Kirensky District

Kaluga Oblast
As of 2012, one rural locality in Kaluga Oblast bears this name:
Yubileyny, Kaluga Oblast, a settlement in Maloyaroslavetsky District

Khanty-Mansi Autonomous Okrug
As of 2012, one rural locality in Khanty-Mansi Autonomous Okrug bears this name:
Yubileyny, Khanty-Mansi Autonomous Okrug, a settlement in Sovetsky District

Kirov Oblast
As of 2012, three rural localities in Kirov Oblast bear this name:
Yubileyny, Kotelnichsky District, Kirov Oblast, a settlement in Yubileyny Rural Okrug of Kotelnichsky District; 
Yubileyny, Omutninsky District, Kirov Oblast, a settlement in Vyatsky Rural Okrug of Omutninsky District; 
Yubileyny, Orichevsky District, Kirov Oblast, a settlement in Lugobolotny Rural Okrug of Orichevsky District;

Krasnodar Krai
As of 2012, one rural locality in Krasnodar Krai bears this name:
Yubileyny, Krasnodar Krai, a settlement in Fontalovsky Rural Okrug of Temryuksky District;

Kursk Oblast
As of 2012, one rural locality in Kursk Oblast bears this name:
Yubileyny, Kursk Oblast, a settlement in Shchetinsky Selsoviet of Kursky District

Mari El Republic
As of 2012, one rural locality in the Mari El Republic bears this name:
Yubileyny, Mari El Republic, a settlement in Yubileyny Rural Okrug of Medvedevsky District;

Novgorod Oblast
As of 2012, one rural locality in Novgorod Oblast bears this name:
Yubileyny, Novgorod Oblast, a settlement in Yubileyninskoye Settlement of Khvoyninsky District

Orenburg Oblast
As of 2012, one rural locality in Orenburg Oblast bears this name:
Yubileyny, Orenburg Oblast, a settlement in Yubileyny Selsoviet of Adamovsky District

Perm Krai
As of 2012, two rural localities in Perm Krai bear this name:
Yubileyny, Gremyachinsk, Perm Krai, a settlement under the administrative jurisdiction of the town of krai significance of Gremyachinsk
Yubileyny, Sivinsky District, Perm Krai, a settlement in Sivinsky District

Saratov Oblast
As of 2012, two rural localities in Saratov Oblast bear this name:
Yubileyny, Novouzensky District, Saratov Oblast, a khutor in Novouzensky District
Yubileyny, Yekaterinovsky District, Saratov Oblast, a settlement in Yekaterinovsky District

Tambov Oblast
As of 2012, one rural locality in Tambov Oblast bears this name:
Yubileyny, Tambov Oblast, a settlement in Balykleysky Selsoviet of Inzhavinsky District

Tula Oblast
As of 2012, one rural locality in Tula Oblast bears this name:
Yubileyny, Tula Oblast, a settlement in Yasnopolyanskaya Rural Administration of Shchyokinsky District

Tver Oblast
As of 2012, one rural locality in Tver Oblast bears this name:
Yubileyny, Tver Oblast, a settlement under the administrative jurisdiction of Likhoslavl Urban Settlement in Likhoslavlsky District

Vologda Oblast
As of 2012, two rural localities in Vologda Oblast bear this name:
Yubileyny, Totemsky District, Vologda Oblast, a settlement in Pogorelovsky Selsoviet of Totemsky District
Yubileyny, Ustyuzhensky District, Vologda Oblast, a settlement in Ustyuzhensky Selsoviet of Ustyuzhensky District

Yaroslavl Oblast
As of 2012, one rural locality in Yaroslavl Oblast bears this name:
Yubileyny, Yaroslavl Oblast, a settlement in Makarovsky Rural Okrug of Rybinsky District

Zabaykalsky Krai
As of 2012, one rural locality in Zabaykalsky Krai bears this name:
Yubileyny, Zabaykalsky Krai, a settlement in Krasnokamensky District

Abolished localities
Yubileyny, Moscow Oblast, a town in Moscow Oblast; merged into the city of Korolyov in June 2014;